Eucalyptus obconica is a species of small tree or a mallee the is endemic to the Kimberley region of Western Australia. It has rough fibrous or flaky, wavy bark on the trunk and branches, lance-shaped to curved or oblong adult leaves, flower buds in groups of seven, white flowers and conical fruit.

Description
It has rough, fibrous or flaky, wavy or tessellated bark on the trunk and branches. Flowering occurs between March and May and the flowers are white.

Taxonomy and naming
Eucalyptus obconica was first formally described in 1994 by Ian Brooker and David Kleinig in their book, Field guide to eucalypts. The specific epithet (obconicus) is Latin, meaning obconical, referring to the shape of the fruit.

Distribution and habitat
This species is found on rocky hill sides in scattered locations in the central and eastern Kimberley region, where it grows in skeletal soils over sandstone or quartzite, often forming pure stands on rocky plateaus.

Conservation status
This eucalypt is classified as "not threatened" by the Government of Western Australia Department of Parks and Wildlife.

See also
 List of Eucalyptus species

References

Eucalypts of Western Australia
obconica
Myrtales of Australia
Plants described in 1994
Taxa named by Ian Brooker